Eyez is a documentary based on the creation and recording of J. Cole's fourth studio album, 4 Your Eyez Only. The film was directed by Scott Lazer, and produced by J. Cole, Ibrahim Hamad and Adam Roy Rodney. It premiered on December 2, 2016 on Tidal.

Premise
The documentary was filmed at Electric Lady Studios in New York City over the summer of 2016, where sessions of the album were recorded. The studio was built by Jimi Hendrix before his death in 1970. Throughout the documentary, J. Cole and his team are captured engaging, brainstorming and recording. Sessions in the studio included musicians playing and recording the Hammond organ, trumpet, bass, and background vocals, while Cole lays down main vocal tracks. Cole explained his goals for the album in a scene saying "You get to this level of platform; the next one might go down. You're never guaranteed to be this high again. So while I'm here, let me use this opportunity to say the realest shit I've ever said." Director Scott Lazer spoke in an interview saying the documentary provides a "fly on the wall" experience saying:

Release
On December 2, 2016, Cole released the 40-minute documentary, titled Eyez. It was released exclusively on Tidal for three days until December 5, when it was made available on Dreamville's YouTube channel. The documentary also features two music videos for the tracks "False Prophets" and "Everybody Dies". Both videos were directed by Lazer who said, "I remember thinking when I was putting this together and I don't know if people beyond Cole's core fan base are really going to enjoy this. I think what the music videos did was give something for people who may not be really into it."

Personnel 
Credits adapted from the documentary film.

 Roperta Spitz — Editor
 David Torcivia — Colorist
 Elad Marish — Audio mix
 Isaiah Donté Lee — Additional photography

See also 
 J. Cole: 4 Your Eyez Only

References

External links 

J. Cole
American documentary films
2010s English-language films
2010s American films